46–48 Brown Street is a grade-II building in Manchester, England. Situated in the Spring Gardens area of Manchester city centre near King Street, it was home to Brook's Bank. The building is also known as Lombard Chambers.

It was built as a bank in 1868, and designed by George Truefitt. The building has a sandstone ashlar exterior and slate roof. It is eclectic in style but has Gothic elements. At the corner there is a three-storey oriel topped with an intricate ironwork crown.

References

Grade II listed buildings in Manchester
Grade II listed banks
Commercial buildings completed in 1868